Stolen Picture is a British film production company founded by Simon Pegg and Nick Frost in 2016, with Miles Ketley joining in July 2017.

Overview
On 16 May 2017, it was announced that Simon Pegg and Nick Frost had launched a film and television production banner called Stolen Picture. The first production by the company was Slaughterhouse Rulez, a horror-comedy film. Crispian Mills directed the project, based on a script he co-wrote with Henry Fitzherbert. Sony Pictures backed the film, which Pegg and Frost executive-produced.

On 20 September 2017, it was announced that Sony Pictures Television had taken a minority stake in the production company. In addition, Stolen Picture entered into an exclusive television distribution deal with Sony. Concurrently with the Sony Pictures Television announcement, it was announced that Miles Ketley has been appointed CEO of Stolen Picture, joining from Bad Wolf. Wayne Garvie, president of international production for Sony Pictures Television, was subsequently hired as the company's chief creative officer.

On 19 January 2018, it was announced that Stolen Picture was developing their first television project Truth Seekers, a half-hour comedy-horror series about a three-person paranormal investigation team. On 1 May 2019, it was announced that Stolen Picture would develop a television adaptation of Ben Aaronovitch's Rivers of London novel series. On 19 October 2020, it was announced that Miles Ketley died unexpectedly, only days before the premiere of the TV comedy Truth Seekers, debuting 30 October.

Simon Pegg and Nick Frost were set to adapt Ben Aaronovitch’s Rivers of London into a series, but the project never came to fruition.  The Guardian reports that Pure Fiction Television and Unnecessary Logo—a production company Aaronovitch himself has created—is set to adapt the series.

Feature films

Television series

References

External links
Official Website
UK Companies Website Profile

British companies established in 2016
British subsidiaries of foreign companies
Sony Pictures Entertainment
Sony Pictures Television production companies
Sony Pictures Television
Mass media companies established in 2016
Film production companies of the United Kingdom
2017 mergers and acquisitions